Eugene Kwame Marfo (born February 1 1997), who goes by the stage name Kuami Eugene  is a Ghanaian High-life and Afrobeat singer-songwriter. He is signed to Lynx Entertainment and Empire Distribution and is known for several songs, including "Angela", "Wish Me Well,"  "Ohemaa" and many others. He won the New Artist awards in 2018 from the Ghana Music Awards and the Ghana Music Awards UK. He also received the Most Promising Artist in Africa award from AFRIMA. In 2019, Kwame Eugene received 7 nominations at the Ghana Music Awards and went on to win the awards for Album of the Year, Producer of the Year, and Highlife Artist of the Year. He was crowned Artist of the Year and High-life Artist of the Year at the 2020 Ghana Music Awards.

Early life 
Kuami Eugene was born to Alex and Juliana Marfo in Akim Oda, Ghana. His interest in music led him to sing in the church from a young age where he also learnt how to play the drum, keyboard, and guitar. He attended the Salvation Army Senior High School located at Akim-Wenchi. The young artist, who grew up in the environs of Fadama, a suburb of Accra furthered his education to Ghana Telecom University.

Music career 
Kuami Eugene was a contestant in the season 5 of the reality competition show MTN Hitmaker in Ghana in 2016, where he finished third overall. He was signed shortly afterward to Lynx Entertainment and has gone on to release several singles. In 2017, "Angela" reached one million views on YouTube, the most for any music artist on that label, and was indicated to be in rotation among the top 10 songs in Ghana. He is a featured artist in "Adwenfi"  by DJ Vyrusky and Shatta Wale. In 2018, he released a continuation of the story line in the "Angela" song called "Confusion". And in June 2018, he released the single "Wish Me Well", which was in response to the negative comments he received on social media.

In 2017, he participated in Sarkodie's Rapperholic Concert in Ghana, on the 25th of December. Ghana Music Honors 2017 Edition, December to Remember 2017,  Concert 2017, the 61st Ghana Independence Celebration Show at Indigo 02 in London. Kuami Eugene has gone on to perform on many more stages including at Oh My Festival in Amsterdam, Afrobeats to the World concert at the PlayStation Theatre in New York, and Afronation in Ghana.

In May 2022, Kuami Eugene released his single 'Take Away' and performed at the 2022 Afrochella in Ghana.

Recognition 
Legendary High-life artist Amakye Dede crowned Kuami Eugene as his successor in high-life music at the 20th edition of the Vodafone Ghana Music Awards.

On the 21st Vodafone Music Awards held at Accra International Conference Centre, Kuami Eugene won the Artiste of the Year, beating off competition from Sarkodie, Medikal, Kofi Kinaata and Diana Hamilton.

Discography

Singles

As featured artist
Below are some of the singles Kuami Eugene has been featured on.

Awards and nominations

References

1997 births
Living people
21st-century Ghanaian singers
Ghanaian songwriters
Ghanaian Afrobeat musicians
Ghanaian highlife musicians